is the 5th greatest hits collection released by Japanese girl group Morning Musume. It features every b-side the group has released thus far on their singles in a set of three discs. It was released on October 7, 2009 in both limited (EPCE-5661～3) and regular (EPCE-5664～6) editions. The limited edition has different album art and includes a photobook.

Track listings

References

External links
Morning Musume Zen Single Coupling Collection entry on the Hello! Project official website 

Morning Musume compilation albums
2009 compilation albums
Zetima compilation albums
B-side compilation albums